Japan participated in the 2010 Winter Olympics in Vancouver, British Columbia, Canada. Ninety-four athletes participated in all sports except ice hockey.  Japanese athletes earned five medals at the games, including three silver and two bronze, short of the 10-medal goal set by the Japanese Olympic team prior to the event.  One-hundred eleven Japanese sports officials and coaches accompanied the 94 athletes to the games, a far higher ratio of staff-to-athlete than most other participating nations.

Medalists

Alpine skiing

Biathlon

Bobsleigh

Cross-country skiing

Curling

Women's tournament 

Standings

Team

Round-robin

Draw 1

Draw 2

Draw 4

Draw 6

Draw 8

Draw 9

Draw 10

Draw 11

Draw 12

Figure skating

Freestyle skiing

Moguls

Ski cross

Luge

*= Disqualified for being over the allowed weight

Nordic combined

Short track speed skating

Men

Women

Skeleton

Ski jumping

Snowboarding

Halfpipe

Parallel Giant Slalom

Snowboard cross

Speed skating

Men

Women

See also
 Japan at the Olympics
 Japan at the 2010 Winter Paralympics

References 

2010 in Japanese sport
Nations at the 2010 Winter Olympics
2010